Spierings Kranen is a Dutch manufacturer of large mobile cranes such as the SK 1265-AT6 "Mighty Tiny" model which can lift up to 10 tons up to 35 metres in height.  The company was founded by Leo Spierings and his wife Tiny in 1987.

References

Crane manufacturers
Construction equipment manufacturers of the Netherlands
Dutch brands